Bash-Kayyngdy is a village in Naryn Region of Kyrgyzstan. It is part of the At-Bashy District. Its population was 5,202 in 2021.

Population

References

External links 
Satellite map at Maplandia.com

Populated places in Naryn Region